The West Burlington Independent School District is a public school district in West Burlington, Iowa, and is home to the West Burlington Falcons.

The district serves almost all residential areas in West Burlington.

Early history
In the history of the district, there have been six buildings which could be called "West Burlington Schools". The first was called "Fairview", however it was located on the north side of Mt. Pleasant Street, which technically made it outside of city limits. The next school was located on the corner of Wheeler and Ramsey street, and was founded around 1888. Later, it was replaced by a brick two-story school which was used until 1939 when a Public Works Administration project happened, which reconstructed the building. It was the only elementary building for students until 1956 when the current elementary was built.

West Burlington Elementary School
The current Elementary school houses Pre-school through grade five. In 1960-61, an eight-room wing was added on and grades four through six were relocated to the elementary building. In 1997 an addition was added to the building and many rooms were remodeled. The old gym was turned into the library and a new wing containing ten classrooms, a gym, and a music room was added. The building was further upgraded in 2005-2006. The new addition contained another set of ten classrooms, a remodeled nurse's office, front office, and special ed classrooms. Eventually, the grades were changed to Pre-school up to grade five.

Central Office (Old Middle School)
The Central Office (formerly West Burlington Middle School) was built in the early 1930s. In 1997 it was converted from a school building to the central offices for the school district due to asbestos issues with the building and lack of handicap access to the second story.

West Burlington Arnold Jr./Sr. High School
West Burlington Arnold Jr./Sr. High School (formerly West Burlington High School & West Burlington Arnold High School) was built in three phases, the first beginning in 1966, and was finished in 1969. In 1972 the school was renamed in honor of Walter E. Arnold, a teacher in the district since 1931, and the Superintendent from 1957 until his death -inside school walls- in 1971. In 1997 a major renovation project was done at the school. The high school gym had the stage removed and a concession stand was put in facing the cafeteria. The Junior High wing was also added. This added nine classrooms, renovated the library, added a computer lab, added another gym, and added a 399-seat auditorium. The front office was also remodeled during this project. Another addition to the building began in the Fall of 2010 that added eight more classrooms.

Athletics
The Falcons compete in the Southeast Iowa Superconference in the following sports:
Basketball
Baseball
Volleyball

And the following as West Burlington-Notre Dame:
Cross Country
Football
Wrestling
Golf
Track and Field
Soccer
Tennis
Softball

See also
List of school districts in Iowa
List of high schools in Iowa

References

External links
 WBISD's website
 
 
 
 - West Burlington Athletic Booster Club
 - Great Prairie AEA
 - Falcon Focus Website
  Elementary school 2021-2022 handbook for the Elementary School

School districts in Iowa
Education in Des Moines County, Iowa
School districts established in 1888
1888 establishments in Iowa